Filip Ivanović (born 13 February 1992) is a Serbian football defender who plays for Radnički 1923 Kragujevac in the Serbian SuperLiga.

Club career
Born in Aranđelovac, Ivanović started his career in Karađorđe Topola football academy. Later he played for Hajduk Beograd, where he made 25 appearances in a period between 2008 and 2014. In the meantime, he had several spells in the neighborhood, playing with the Belgrade Zone League side Zvezdara. After a half-season with Lokomotiva Beograd, Ivanović moved to Bežanija, where he spent the whole 2015. At the beginning of 2016, Ivanović joined Sloga Petrovac. He left after the club dissolved in the summer same year. Later he promoted as a new player of football club Inđija. Making 23 appearances with 3 goals, Ivanović was elected in the team of the 2016–17 Serbian First League season, by Sportski žurnal. In summer 2017, Ivanović signed a three-year deal with the Serbian top tier club Radnik Surdulica.

On 26 June 2018, it was announced about Ivanović signing with Azerbaijan Premier League side Sabah. Several days later, the transfer was confirmed by Radnik Surdulica sporting director Darko Gašić.

Career statistics

References

External links
 
 
 

1992 births
Living people
People from Aranđelovac
Association football defenders
Serbian footballers
FK Hajduk Beograd players
FK Zvezdara players
FK Bežanija players
FK Sloga Petrovac na Mlavi players
FK Inđija players
FK Radnik Surdulica players
Serbian First League players
Serbian SuperLiga players
Serbian expatriate footballers
Serbian expatriate sportspeople in Azerbaijan
Expatriate footballers in Azerbaijan
Sabah FC (Azerbaijan) players
Azerbaijan Premier League players